Luca Pierfelici (born 3 September 1983) is an Italian former professional road cyclist.

Major results

2004
 6th Trofeo Internazionale Bastianelli
2005
 2nd Gara Ciclistica Montappone
 9th GP Capodarco
2007
 3rd Overall Settimana Internazionale di Coppi e Bartali
 4th Overall Settimana Ciclista Lombarda
 9th Memorial Marco Pantani
2008
 3rd Overall Route du Sud
 6th Overall Brixia Tour
 8th Overall Euskal Bizikleta

References

External links

1983 births
Living people
Italian male cyclists
People from Urbino